Edmond Bowe (2 February 1865 -  7 April 1937) was an Irish hurler who played for the Tipperary senior team.

Bowe was a member of the team for just one season during the 1887 championship. It was a successful season as he secured an All-Ireland medal that year. It was Tipperary's first All-Ireland title.

At club level Bowe enjoyed a long career with Moycarkey–Borris.

References

1866 births
1937 deaths
Moycarkey-Borris hurlers
Tipperary inter-county hurlers
All-Ireland Senior Hurling Championship winners